The 4th Gaudí Awards, overseen by the Catalan Film Academy, were presented on 6 February 2012 at the Arteria Theater Paral·lel in Barcelona, Catalonia.

Winners and nominees 
Winners are listed first and highlighted in boldface.

Honorary Gaudí Awards

 Pere Portabella

References

Gaudí Awards
2012 in Spanish cinema
2012 in Catalonia